William Keever (born 14 March 1976) is an American former sport shooter who competed in the 2000 Summer Olympics.

References

1974 births
Living people
American male sport shooters
Trap and double trap shooters
Olympic shooters of the United States
Shooters at the 2000 Summer Olympics
Pan American Games medalists in shooting
Pan American Games silver medalists for the United States
Shooters at the 2003 Pan American Games
20th-century American people
21st-century American people